"In-A-Gadda-Da-Vida" (derived from "In the Garden of Eden") is a song recorded by Iron Butterfly, written by bandmember Doug Ingle and released on their 1968 album of the same name. 

At slightly over 17 minutes, it occupies the entire second side of the album. The lyrics, a love song from the biblical Adam to his mate Eve, are simple and are heard only at the beginning and the end. The middle of the song features a two-and-a-half-minute Ron Bushy drum solo.

"In-A-Gadda-Da-Vida" was Iron Butterfly's only song to reach the top 40, reaching number 30, while the album itself reached number four on the album chart and sold over 30 million copies. An 8-minute-20-second edit of the song was included in the soundtrack to the 1986 film Manhunter. In 2009, it was named the 24th-greatest hard rock song of all time by VH1. It is also often regarded as an influence on heavy metal music and one of the firsts of the genre.

Background
Though it was not recorded until their second album, "In-A-Gadda-Da-Vida" was written during Iron Butterfly's early days. According to drummer Ron Bushy, organist-vocalist Doug Ingle wrote the song one evening while drinking an entire gallon of Red Mountain wine. When the inebriated Ingle then played the song for Bushy, who wrote down the lyrics for him, he was slurring his words so badly that what was supposed to be "in the Garden of Eden" was interpreted by Bushy as "In-A-Gadda-Da-Vida".

Even though nearly all of Iron Butterfly's songs were quite structured, the idea of turning the minute-and-a-half-long ballad into an extended jam emerged very early; Jeff Beck claims that when he saw Iron Butterfly perform at the Galaxy Club on Sunset Boulevard in Los Angeles in April 1967, half a year before the band recorded their first album, their entire second set consisted of a 35-minute-long version of "In-A-Gadda-Da-Vida". The track was recorded at Ultrasonic Studios in Hempstead, Long Island, New York.

Reception
Cash Box said that it was an "eerie blues work with a pounding rhythm backing and hypnotic chord structures".

Track listing

Charts

Other versions
Incredible Bongo Band covered the song in 1973. The composer and percussionist David Van Tieghem released a version and two remixes in 1986. 16 BIT (a German dance project from 1986 to 1989 by Michael Münzing and Luca Anzilotti) recorded in 1987 a single "(Ina) Gadda-Da-Vida", also included in album Inaxycvgtgb. New Jersey psychedelic band 6 Feet Under recorded a version in the late 1960s.
In 1987, Slayer recorded a cover version that appears on the Less than Zero soundtrack. Rapper Nas sampled the Incredible Bongo Band's cover version of the song on his singles "Thief's Theme" and "Hip Hop Is Dead".

In popular culture
 Ron Bushy's drum solo was the inspiration for Ringo Starr's drum solo on "The End" from the Beatles 1969 album, Abbey Road. It was the last song recorded collectively by all four Beatles.
 The song was parodied in The Residents' 1976 album, The Third Reich 'n Roll.
 The song is prominently featured in the finale of the 1986 film Manhunter, in which serial killer Francis Dolarhyde plays the song (via an 8-track tape of its parent album) throughout his final shootout.
 Much of "In-A-Gadda-Da Vida" is played during the 1989 season one episode of Quantum Leap, "Star Crossed".
 In 1990, the song was featured in The Wonder Years Season 3 Episode 17, "Night Out".
 It is played in the 1991 film Freddy's Dead: The Final Nightmare.
 The song was featured in the 1991 first season of the television series Home Improvement in the episode "Flying Sauces". 
 Portions of the song are featured in a 1995 episode of The Simpsons, "Bart Sells His Soul", in which Bart Simpson tricks Reverend Lovejoy's church into singing the song as an opening hymn by handing out sheet music titled "In the Garden of Eden" by "I. Ron Butterfly". Lovejoy describes the hymn as "sound[ing] like rock and/or roll". The church organist, an elderly woman, collapses after playing for the entire seventeen minutes.
 Small parts and riffs of the song were adapted in the soundtrack for the 2004 film Ocean's Twelve. They were not included in the official release of the movie's soundtrack album.
 The song is referenced in the 2005 Gilmore Girls season 5 episode 'Come Home' when Sebastian Bach's character asks a group of traditional Korean musicians if they know how to play it.
Most of the song is played during the 2007 House season three episode "The Jerk".
 In 2007, in the film Resident Evil 3: Extinction, it is played while the caravan cruises the desert.
 A 2010 episode of the animated sitcom Futurama references the song in its title: "In-A-Gadda-Da-Leela", replacing the last portion of the song title with the name of one of the show’s main protagonists, Turanga Leela.
 A shortened version of the song was featured in the 2013 premiere of American Horror Story: Coven.
 The song was featured in the climax of Rob Zombie's 2019 film 3 From Hell.

See also
 List of 1960s one-hit wonders in the United States

References

1968 singles
Iron Butterfly songs
Mondegreens
Song recordings produced by Frank Farian
Boney M. songs
Songs written by Doug Ingle
Atco Records singles
Hansa Records singles
Atlantic Records singles
1968 songs
American heavy metal songs